Edip Tepeli (born 18 April 1989) is a Turkish actor. He is best known for his role as Batuga in the television series Destan.

Life and career 
Tepeli is a graduate of Istanbul University State Conservatory with a degree in theatre studies. After appearing in various plays at different venues, including Istanbul City Theatres, he made his television debut in 2014 with a role in the historical fiction drama series Kurt Seyit ve Şura. He continued his career on television with roles in Seni Kimler Aldı, Yıldızlar Şahidim, and Yaşamayanlar. His breakthrough came with his recurring role in Sefirin Kızı. In 2021, he was cast in a leading role in the historical fiction drama series Destan, opposite Ebru Şahin.

Personal life 
Tepeli is a Muslim and he resides in Izmir, Turkey. In 2017, he married Ayşecan Tatari, an actress like himself, in New York. The couple's daughter Müjgan Tepeli was born in 2020.

Filmography

Television

Film

Theatre

Awards

References

External links 

 
 

1989 births
Living people
Turkish male television actors
Turkish male stage actors
Turkish male film actors
Actors from İzmir
Istanbul University alumni